MFCC can refer to:

Mel-frequency cepstrum coefficients, mathematical coefficients for sound modeling
Marriage, family and child counselor, a credential in the field of professional counseling
Malta Fairs & Conventions Centre, a multi-purpose venue in Ta' Qali, Attard, Malta.